The Estadio Parque Maracaná is a football stadium in Casavalle, Montevideo, Uruguay. It has a capacity of 8,000 and is the home stadium of Club Sportivo Cerrito. The stadium opened on Saturday 20 September 2008, with a match between Cerrito and Huracán Buceo in the Segunda División which Cerrito won 3 -0.

References

P
Sports venues completed in 2008